Mirko Dickhaut (born 11 January 1971) is a German football coach and a former player.

Career statistics

References

External links

1971 births
Living people
2. Bundesliga managers
Sportspeople from Kassel
Association football defenders
Association football midfielders
German footballers
German football managers
Eintracht Frankfurt players
VfL Bochum players
VfL Bochum II players
SW Bregenz players
KSV Hessen Kassel players
Bundesliga players
2. Bundesliga players
Austrian Football Bundesliga players
KSV Hessen Kassel managers
SpVgg Greuther Fürth managers
Footballers from Hesse